Buldana Urban Cooperative Credit Society was formed on 15 August 1986. Chairman (Mr.) Radheshyamji Chandak started it with capital of 210 USD and 72 members. In a span of 27 years and mainly in last decade under managing director Dr Sukesh Zamwar, the Credit Society has grown to size of 1.1 billion dollar business with more than half a million (700,000) membership.  The area of operation is mainly in central and western India in four states of India. Now the society has 333 branches and 5000 employee and 300 warehouses. Total built up area for Warehouse is 5,000,000 sq feet and capacity of 435,000 metric tons.  It maintains a presence in most of the metro cities of India and also in rural areas.

Awards and achievements 

 Credit union Micro Finance innovation award given by the Asian Confederation of Credit Union in Manila by International Cooperative Alliance  Chairman Pauline Green.
 Best cooperative credit society award by Apex body of Indian cooperative, National Cooperative Union of India in 2008 and in 2013.
 Managing director of Buldana Urban Cooperative Credit Society becomes chairman of International Cooperative Alliance Asia pacific Youth Committee.
 India coordinator of Asian Confederation of Credit Unions.
 World Corporate Excellence Award 
 Banking frontiers 2014 – Best Youth CEO Award

Activities 

The co-operative society business activities mainly are in warehouse loan business, gold loan business, industrial finance, infrastructure finance business, housing loan and vehicle loans, individual loan business, and education loans. Lending is not to be the sole business of any credit union; it must do something for members.

The Credit Society's principles, or breakout innovations are:
 Four Pillar System – all the money in the world goes to banks.
 Social banking – people's money should be utilized for well being of people.

Technology use 
To handle business for its 700,000 customers scattered in four states and 5,000 employees, its branches are connected by a core banking network, a data center and core banking software. It provides facilities for debit card, internet banking and mobile valet to customers, as well as real time money transfer and online warehousing.  In India, the banking sector is still lagging behind the developed world, so to reach unbanked people in Buldana Urban, it has started a mobile banking van.

In 2012, the service was started in Pune.

Buldana Urban Industries 

Buldana and its subsidiaries run many industries

 Pharmaceutical company manufacturing anticancer drugs
 Mineral water plant
 Cleaning and grading units at warehouses with day packing facility
 Sugar factory
 Milling of pulses	
 Soybean Seed plant
 Village development programs
 Buldana Urban Credit Care 
 Safety And Security Company
 Buldana Urban Charitable Trust

References

External links 

 
 Buldana Urban Sociedade Cooperativa de Crédito

Cooperative banks of India
Buldhana
Cooperatives in Maharashtra
1986 establishments in Maharashtra
Banks established in 1986
Indian companies established in 1986
Banks based in Maharashtra